Operation Sky Net is a clandestine operation of the Chinese Ministry of Public Security to apprehend Overseas Chinese it sees as fugitives guilty of financial crimes in Mainland China. The initiative was launched in 2015 to  investigate offshore companies and underground banks that transfer money abroad. It has reportedly been consolidated with Operation Fox Hunt and returned around 10,000 fugitives to China in the last decade, including political dissidents and activists.

Human rights violations 

Human rights NGO Safeguard Defenders highlighted methods used in Operation Sky Net, included the detention of fugitives' relatives in Mainland China, dispatching agents overseas to illegally intimidate the person in their overseas location, or kidnap them and return them to China. In some cases, authorities froze family assets or even threatened to take away their children.

See also
Operation Fox Hunt
Anti-corruption campaign under Xi Jinping
Chinese intelligence activity abroad
Chinese information operations and information warfare
Extraterritorial jurisdiction
Hong Kong national security law
Human rights in China
Ministry of Public Security (China)
Ministry of State Security (China)
Political offences in China

References 

Corruption in China
Espionage in China
Espionage in the United States
Chinese diaspora
Political repression in China
Extraterritorial jurisdiction
Ministry of Public Security (China)